Nii Nortei Nortey (born 29 October 1994) is an English professional footballer who plays as a midfielder for Northern Colorado Hailstorm in the USL League One.

Nortey started his career at Chelsea's academy but was released in 2013 and had a spell at Maidenhead United before joining Welling United in August 2015, where he started his senior career. He joined Wrexham ahead of the following season, but made just 6 league appearances before joining Solihull Moors on loan in December 2016, before joining them permanently in January 2017.

He signed for Dover Athletic in summer 2017, before being released at the end of the 2018–19 season after 6 goals in 67 league matches. He joined Chorley in September 2019 but left the club after their relegation to the National League North. He signed for Scottish Championship side Queen of the South in October 2020.

Early and personal life
Nortey's parents are both from Ghana, but he was born in Hammersmith, London, and grew up in London.

During the summer of 2017, his older brother Leon died through a sudden unexpected death in epilepsy, whilst he also lost his sister.

Club career

Early career
Nortey joined Chelsea at under-15 level and spent five years at the club, winning the FA Youth Cup, before being released in 2013 at the end of his scholarship. Having subsequently had multiple trial spells across Europe, including at Sheffield Wednesday, he joined Maidenhead United on a free transfer in February 2014.

Welling United
On 11 August 2015, he joined National League side Welling United on a short-term deal. He made his senior debut as a half-time substitute in a 1–0 away defeat to Forest Green Rovers that same day. His full Welling debut came on 19 September in a 2–1 away victory over Gateshead. He scored his first senior goal on 28 March 2016 with a near-post flick – the winning goal of a 2–1 victory over Woking. Nortey made 32 league appearances for Welling – scoring once – as Welling were relegated to the National League South after finishing bottom of the National League on 35 points.

Wrexham and Solihull Moors
On 22 June 2016, he joined National League side Wrexham on a one-year deal. He made his debut as a 93rd minute substitute in a 3–2 victory away to Guiseley on 9 August 2016. His first start of the season came on 10 September in a 1–0 home victory over Sutton United, but was substituted off at half-time. Having made 6 league appearances, he joined fellow National League club Solihull Moors on a one-month loan deal on 6 December 2016. After making three league appearances during his loan spell, he joined Solihull Moors on a permanent basis on 6 January 2017 following the termination of his contract at Wrexham. He scored his first goal for Solihull on 18 March 2017 in the 90th minute of a 4–1 victory over North Ferriby United after coming on as a substitute. He scored once in 15 league matches during his permanent spell at the club.

Dover Athletic
Nortey joined National League Dover Athletic on a one-year deal following a trial period in July 2017. He started their opening game of the season as Dover defeated Hartlepool United 1–0 away from home on 5 August. He scored his first goal for Dover on 16 September 2017 as they won 4–0 at home to Chester, with Nortey scoring the third after 70 minutes. He scored five goals in 33 matches for Dover during the 2017–18 National League. The 2018–19 season saw him make 34 appearances in the National League, scoring once with the opening goal of a 4–3 victory over Havant & Waterlooville on 14 August 2018. However, he was released by Dover at the end of his contract in summer 2019.

Chorley
In September 2019, Nortey joined Chorley, having spent pre-season on trial with Bradford City. He made his debut on 24 September as a substitute in a 3–1 defeat at home to Barrow. His full debut was a 0–0 draw with Dagenham & Redbridge on 28 September 2019. Following the early conclusion of the National League season in March 2020 due to the COVID-19 pandemic in England with Chorley bottom after 38 games, they were relegated to the National League North after the table was decided on a points per game system, with Chorley finishing bottom. Nortey appeared in 24 league matches for Chorley, but was released by Chorley at the end of the season.

Queen of the South
Nortey signed for Scottish Championship club Queen of the South in October 2020 until the 31 May 2021.

Northern Colorado Hailstorm
On 27 January 2022, Nortey moved to the United States to sign with third-tier USL League One club Northern Colorado Hailstorm ahead of their inaugural season.

International career
Nortey was born in England but is also eligible to represent Ghana at international level.

Career statistics

References

1994 births
Living people
English footballers
Footballers from Hammersmith
Association football midfielders
Chelsea F.C. players
Maidenhead United F.C. players
Welling United F.C. players
Wrexham A.F.C. players
Solihull Moors F.C. players
Dover Athletic F.C. players
Chorley F.C. players
Queen of the South F.C. players
Northern Colorado Hailstorm FC players
National League (English football) players
Scottish Professional Football League players
English sportspeople of Ghanaian descent
English expatriate footballers
English expatriate sportspeople in the United States
Expatriate soccer players in the United States